La Chapelle-du-Lou-du-Lac is a commune in the Ille-et-Vilaine department of western France. The municipality was established on 1 January 2016 and consists of the former communes of La Chapelle-du-Lou and Le Lou-du-Lac.

See also 
Communes of the Ille-et-Vilaine department

References 

Chapelleduloudulac

Communes nouvelles of Ille-et-Vilaine
Populated places established in 2017
2017 establishments in France